"New Soul" is a song by the French-Israeli R&B/soul singer Yael Naïm, from her self-titled second album. The song gained popularity in the United States following its use by Apple in an advertisement for their MacBook Air laptop. In the song Naïm sings of being a new soul who has come into the world to learn "a bit 'bout how to give and take". However, she finds that things are harder than they seem. The song, also featured in the films The House Bunny and Wild Target, features a prominent "la la la la" section as its hook. It remains Naïm's biggest hit single in the US to date, and her only one to reach the top 40 of the Billboard Hot 100.

"New Soul" was mixed and mastered by S. Husky Höskulds at Groundlift Studios, Reykjavik and Los Angeles.

Composition 
The sheet music for "New Soul" published in the key of C major, and is set in time signature of common time with a tempo of 100 beats per minute. Yael Naim's vocal range spans from A3 to A5.

Music video
The video shows Naïm moving into an empty apartment. She covers the walls in wallpaper depicting a lake surrounded by forest. She then begins unpacking several other things, including furniture, a piano, a goldfish in a bowl and a number of photographs of people, which she hangs on the wall. As she hangs the photographs, the people in the pictures are shown in real life, in the setting depicted in the pictures. Naïm then begins painting on the photographs, and whatever she paints appears with the people in real life. She removes one of the pictures to discover a hole in the wall, revealing the actual forest setting shown in the wallpaper. She pushes on the wall, and it falls away into the lake. The remaining walls fall onto the water leaving the floor of the apartment like a raft floating on the lake, together with her furniture. The people from her pictures reach her by boat. They climb onto the makeshift raft with her, as they all celebrate, dancing and playing instruments, whilst she empties the goldfish bowl into the lake.

In 2008, the video received strong airplay on MTV.

Chart performance
In the issue dated 16 February 2008, "New Soul" debuted on the U.S. Billboard Hot 100 at number 9, giving Naïm her first single ever to enter any US chart. It reached number 7 on the Hot 100 before falling to number 42 the following week. It later rebounded due to being featured on the Apple MacBook Air commercials, but nonetheless the song spent a total of 19 weeks on the chart. It debuted at number 44 on the Canadian Hot 100, and jumped to number 7 on the chart the following week. In her birth country of France, the single hit number 1 on the French Singles Chart. In February 2008, it debuted on the UK Singles Chart at number 42 and reached a peak of number 30 one month later.

Personnel
 Yael Naim – vocals, guitar, piano, composition, lyrics
 Laurent David – bass, guitar
 David Donatien – drums
 Sebastien Llado – trombone

Charts

Weekly charts

Year-end charts

Certifications

See also
Ultratop 40 number-one hits of 2008
List of number-one hits of 2008 (France)

References

External links
Official video

2008 singles
Ultratop 50 Singles (Wallonia) number-one singles
Yael Naim songs
2008 songs